Harriet Brown is an American writer, magazine editor, and  professor of magazine journalism at the S.I. Newhouse School of Public Communications at Syracuse University.

Career

She began her magazine career in 1979, with a stint at Popular Science magazine. She was part of the start-up staffs for both Wigwag magazine, 1989–1991, and American Girl magazine American Girl, 1992–2000. Her 2006 New York Times article "One Spoonful at a Time" chronicled her daughter's descent into anorexia and recovery via family-based treatment, also known as the Maudsley approach. That article became the basis of her 2010 book, Brave Girl Eating. Her experiences inspired Brown to begin working as an advocate for better eating-disorders treatment. That same year she helped found Maudsley Parents, a website offering resources to families struggling with anorexia.

As a professor at Newhouse, Brown continues to write, research, and teach about eating disorders and body image as well as other issues, including family estrangement. She writes for The New York Times science section and magazine, O: The Oprah Magazine, Health magazine, and many other publications. In 2011 she won the John F. Murray Prize in Strategic Communication for the Public Good, awarded by the University of Iowa School of Journalism. She currently lives in Syracuse, NY.

Bibliography

Writer
Shadow Daughter: A Memoir of Estrangement
Body of Truth: How Science, History, and Culture Drive Our Obsession with Weight—and What We Can Do About It
Brave Girl Eating: A Family's Struggle with Anorexia
The Good-bye Window: A Year in the Life of a Day-Care Center

Editor
Mr. Wrong: Real-Life Stories About the Men We Used to Love (Ballantine), 2007
Feed Me!: Writers Dish About Food, Eating, Body Image, and Weight (Ballantine, 2009)

References

External links
 Harriet Brown's website
 Maudsley Parents
 Project BodyTalk
 Training Institute for Child and Adolescent Eating Disorders

American magazine editors
Living people
Syracuse University faculty
Year of birth missing (living people)
American women non-fiction writers
20th-century American non-fiction writers
20th-century American women writers
21st-century American non-fiction writers
21st-century American women writers
Women magazine editors
American women academics